The Lomariopsidaceae is a family of ferns with a largely tropical distribution. In the Pteridophyte Phylogeny Group classification of 2016 (PPG I), the family is placed in the suborder Polypodiineae (eupolypods I) of the order Polypodiales. Alternatively, it may be treated as the subfamily Lomariopsidoideae  of a very broadly defined family Polypodiaceae sensu lato.

Genera
The Pteridophyte Phylogeny Group classification of 2016 (PPG I) included four genera. Dryopolystichum was added in 2017, and Thysanosoria is now included in Lomariopsis, so that four genera are recognized :
Cyclopeltis J.Sm.
Dracoglossum Christenh.
Dryopolystichum Copel.
Lomariopsis Fée (including Thysanosoria)

The genus Nephrolepis has also been placed in this family, but it is now placed in its own family, Nephrolepidaceae.

Some members of the Lomariopsidaceae are cultivated as ornamental plants.

Phylogeny

References

Polypodiales
Fern families